Efraín López Neris (born April 1, 1937) is a Sephardi Puerto Rican actor, producer and cinematographer that has had a long trajectory in Puerto Rico's national artistic scene.

Born in Caguas in April 1, 1937, he had his start in Puerto Rican television in the 1960s by joining the cast of various comedy shows. Among his memorable television characters, "Don Florito" parodied great opera singers and operatic arias, a concept that predated that of Adam Sandler's Opera Man by at least fifteen years. His "Candido" had López portray an extremely naive married man who placed too much confidence in his wife and their mutual house painter friend ("mi amigo, el pintor"), whose profession led quite well to dozens of double entendres about his wife's proclivities, acknowledged by everyone but himself. Perhaps his "Don Lolo" character was his most popular one, as a very old man with a very sharp tongue. He originally portrayed the character as having Parkinson's disease, a trait which he later discontinued after protests from patient advocates. A recent character, "Vázquez", has López portraying a dimwitted security guard, with a penchant for food, Spanglish and politics, who is also a strong -and rather inept- supporter of the New Progressive Party of Puerto Rico. López played this character on some of Sunshine Logroño's comedic productions.

López also had a popular radio program in his native city of Caguas, 'El Show de López Neris'. A comedic character from this era was Mister Ñemerson. He staged a fake hijack in one of his programs, which led to a police intervention, dozens of phone calls of concerned listeners to the radio station, protests by some of these when they learned that the hijack attempt was a hoax, and perhaps led to the cancellation of the program soon after.

As a film actor, López Neris has been cast in films such as Wedding Ring (CBS), Los que nunca amaron (Mexico), Mientras Puerto Rico duerme, La vida de Rafael Hernandez, Muchacha, Mas alla del Capitolio, Harbor Lights (Columbia Pictures), Up the Sandbox with Barbra Streisand, and more recently in Angelito mio.

Being an aficionado of cinematography from a very young age, López graduated from the University of Puerto Rico at Mayaguez, with post graduate studies at the Herbert Berghof Studio and Bown Adams Studio in the U.S. He produced and was the first host of La Camara Comica (a take on the popular American show Candid Camera).

López Neris behind the camera work includes directing credits, being productions like El Corral, En la distancia, La ventana, La palomilla, Isabel la negra (A Life of Sin), Candido, El ultimo dia, and Caguas, centro y corazon de Puerto Rico.

As a television artistic director, he has done work on Marcano el show, El show de Luis Vigoreaux, Con lo que cuenta este país, El Gran Bejuco, and Burundanga.

He has past credits as creative director of shows like Camara Cómica, El show de Tommy, Esto no tiene nombre, Los Garcia, Los genios and El show de López Neris.

His theatre credits include acting, directing and/or producing in plays such as La tia de Carlitos, Una sola puerta hacia la muerte, Amordio, Club de solteros, Sida, Yo, Juan Ponce de León, and Le pegue un cuernito.

Efraín Lopez Neris was once part of the 1960s political parody show El efecto de los rayos gamma sobre Eddie López (now known as Los Rayos Gamma).

References

External links
 

Puerto Rican male actors
Puerto Rican male film actors
Puerto Rican male television actors
1937 births
Living people
People from Caguas, Puerto Rico